IEEE Pakistan Student Congress (PSC)  has emerged as an annual event to gather IEEE Student Branches from all over Pakistan.  The first annual event was held in 2007 at Karachi section, the second at Lahore section in 2008, the third at Islamabad section in 2009, and the fourth at Karachi section in 2010.

In the past few years, IEEE Student Branches in Pakistan organizes nationwide Student Congress since 2007.  Pakistan have three IEEE Sections namely Karachi Section, Lahore Section and Islamabad Section. Pakistan also have IEEE Sub Section at Peshawar.
IEEE NUCES, Karachi organized the First IEEE PSC 2007 on July 6–7, 2007.  Second IEEE PSC 2008 was organized at IEEE GCUF, Faisalabad on August 16–17, 2008. IEEE PSC 2009 was organized at IEEE SEECS, NUST, Islamabad during May 29–31, 2009  and IEEE PSC 2010 was organized at IEEE UIT, Karachi on October 30–31, 2010.  On same pattern IEEE Karachi Section Student Congress 2008 was organized at IEEE PNEC, Karachi on December 26, 2008.

Youth organisations based in Pakistan
Annual events in Pakistan
Recurring events established in 2007
2007 establishments in Pakistan